Lillian "Billie" Yarbo (March 17, 1905 – June 12, 1996) was an American stage and screen comedienne, dancer, and singer.

Early life
Born Lillian Yarbough in Washington, DC, Billie eventually made her way to New York, as did both her mother and at least one sister—though exactly when this happened and whether they made this pilgrimage all at once or separately and at different times, remains unclear.

Career

Stage
The 'Real' Billie
By her early 20s, Yarbo, credited prior to October 1928 as Yarbough, was a rising star, both in Harlem night spots and on the Broadway stage. Writing in The New Yorker, reviewing the Miller and Lyles musical, Keep Shufflin, a young Charles Brackett alerted readers:
 With a style sometimes likened to that of her contemporary, Josephine Baker, Yarbo was embraced by audiences and critics alike, beginning in the late 1920s and continuing until her 1936 screen debut.Pulaski, Jack (as "Ibee"). "Legitimate; With Music: 'Keep Shufflin'". Variety. March 7, 1928. Page 52. As for her vocal stylings, just a few, fleeting, onscreen remnants exist (see relevant excerpt from The Family Next Door in External links). That said, Yarbo clearly did not lack for confidence, having once told trumpeter Buck Clayton, "To hell with Billie Holiday! Come down and listen to me, the real Billie."

ScreenTwenty-Four Sheet' Lil'''
Yarbo appeared in at least two films in 1936 and one in 1937 before receiving glowing notices—and her first onscreen credit—the following year in the otherwise indifferently received Warren William vehicle, Wives Under Suspicion.Grange, Marion. "At the Motion Picture Theaters". The Ottawa Citizen. June 27, 1938. Page 15. For that and her equally acclaimed performance in Frank Capra's hugely successful adaptation of Kaufman and Hart's You Can't Take It With YouLusk, Norbert. "Capra Feature Acclaimed as 'Best of the Season'". The Los Angeles Times. September 12, 1938. Page 38. (which, by virtue of the film's panoramic, full-cast billboard, also inspired a new nickname),Poole, Edwin E.; Poole, Susan T. Collecting Movie Posters: An Illustrated Reference Guide to. Jefferson, NC: McFarland & Company. 1997. . Yarbo was judged 1938's best Negro comedic actress by Pittsburgh Courier film critic Earl J. Morris. In 1939, she was awarded that same distinction by the short-lived Sepia Theatrical Writers Guild.LaMar, Lawrence F. "News of the Theatres: First Annual Sepia Screen Poll". The Phoenix Index. December 30, 1939. Page 7. Indeed, even prior to 1938, the then-as-yet thoroughly anonymous Yarbo—as Claire Trevor's maid in Alfred Werker's much-rewritten Big Town Girl—caught the eye of one discerning reviewer.

Awards and critical plaudits notwithstanding, and despite the sentiments ascribed to director King Vidor as early as 1937 (following Yarbo's sophomore screen turn, appearing uncredited with Barbara Stanwyck in Vidor's Stella Dallas), she continued to be routinely cast in bit parts, primarily as a maid, cook or otherwise low-skilled worker, often uncredited, appearing in at least 50 films between 1936 and 1949.

In the fall of 1943, amid an already setback-laden half-decade,Smallwood, Bill. "The Delightful Side". The California Eagle. February 12, 1942. Page 5. a potentially career-altering opportunity—being cast in a straight dramatic role opposite Canada Lee in what might well have become the definitive screen adaptation of Richard Wright's Native Son—failed to materialize when Orson Welles, who had directed Lee in the original Broadway production, proved unavailable.Calvin, Dolores. "Seein' Stars". The Chicago Bee. December 5, 1943. Page 17. Adding injury to insult, just weeks later, a near-fatal car crash put Yarbo out of commission for the first half of 1944.Gipson, J.T. "Candid Comments: Scannin' the News Tickertape;  Snappy Comeback". The California Eagle. July 20, 1944. Page 12. She appeared in just one film that year, and over the next five—ending her screen career much as it had begun—averaged exactly two films a year, uncredited in all but one.

Later career
On November 13, 1948, roughly four months after finishing work on what would prove to be her final film (and roughly 13 years since last having performed onstage), Yarbo made her return to live performance. Perhaps inspired by having made, roughly two months prior, "one of her rare visits to a night spot," Yarbo, backed by Andy Kirk and His Clouds of Joy, performed at a benefit event staged at Club Congo (formerly Club Alabam) by the Alpha Phi Alpha House Campaign Committee to "provide a much-needed housing [sic] and scholarship for 'forgotten' students."

On May 19, 1949, The California Eagle's Gertrude Gipson reported that "C. P. Johnson on along with a six-piece combo, and Billy Yarbo, who has returned to dancing, will open at the Fairbanks in Alaska around the first." Whether or not this actually came to pass is unclear, but if so, it would appear to be Yarbo's last documented public performance.

Similarly unclear is the matter of whether, during that same period, Yarbo had occasion to see some very nice notices greeting her penultimate screen performance (and final credited one), portraying "a giggling, singing, four-times-married little maid"'Mae Tinee'. "Most Useless in This Film Is the Film Itself". The Chicago Tribune. May 17, 1949. page 17. Retrieved January 20, 2021. in Warner Bros.' long-shelved Night Unto Night (1949), one more instance of Yarbo being one of the few reasons to watch—precisely as had been the case in her first credited role—in an otherwise "sleep-induc[ing]" picture:

Personal life
In 2006, NYU Professor of Media Studies Cathrine Kellison, speaking on the DVD commentary track of You Can't Take It With You (1938), briefly addressed Yarbo's known history: "Now Lillian Yarbo, here... she's... it's troubling how little information there is about her as a person. She was in probably 40, 50 films. Many of them, her name was not listed; she was uncredited." Kellison, who would die in 2009 with online newspaper archives still slim, did not live long enough to learn of Yarbo's illustrious pre-Hollywood heyday.

Yet taking into account the full scope of her career, it is curious that the close press coverage of YarboSmallwood, Bill. "Coastin'". The People's Voice. February 13, 1943. Page 26. "Billie Yarbo will step off the 20th Century Ltd. any morning now. The Super Chief's out from LA to see her ailing sis in NY. Her current turn before Columbia's cameras is being rushed so she may make the trip minus being harried or hurried. Billie's topnotch folks, and we love her." Retrieved January 31, 2021. halted in the fall of 1949. After over two decades, it could be surmised that this was requested by Yarbo herself. One reason why she might have desired less attention appeared in a 1928 interview which, despite its condescending tone, portrays Yarbo as someone who did not aspire to fame and who—somewhat akin to her celebrated not-quite-namesake—genuinely valued her privacy.

Having finally secured that privacy, and adroitly handled her finances,Morris, Earl. "Grand Town, Day and Night: Billie building up her economy for reconversion". The California Eagle. October 12, 1944. Page 12. Retrieved January 31, 2021. Yarbo appears to have spent the remainder of her life in relative comfort in Seattle, Washington, where she died on June 12, 1996.

Stage work
Partial listing of stage work (as Billie Yarbo, except where otherwise noted):

FilmographyRainbow on the River (1936) – Seline (uncredited)Stella Dallas (1937) – Gladys (uncredited)Big Town Girl (1937) – Scarlett (uncredited)Wives Under Suspicion (1938) – CreolaPenrod's Double Trouble (1938) – Mrs. Washington (uncredited)You Can't Take It With You (1938) – RhebaUp the River (1938) – Black Prisoner (uncredited)There's That Woman Again (1938) – Ladies Room Attendant (uncredited)Kentucky (1938) – Magnolia (uncredited)Persons in Hiding (1939) – Beauty Parlor MaidCafe Society (1939) – Mattie Harriett (uncredited)Society Lawyer (1939) – Sadie – Judy's Maid (uncredited)The Story of Vernon and Irene Castle (1939) – Mary – Claire's Maid (uncredited)The Family Next Door (1939) – BlossomBoy Friend (1939) – Delphinie (uncredited)The Jones Family in Hollywood (1939) – Maid (uncredited)The Gracie Allen Murder Case (1939) – Maid (uncredited)Way Down South (1939) – JanieDestry Rides Again (1939) – ClaraHoneymoon Deferred (1940) – Janet's Maid (uncredited)Lillian Russell (1940) – Maid (uncredited)Lucky Cisco Kid (1940) – Queenie (uncredited)They Drive By Night (1940) – Chloe (uncredited)The Return of Frank James (1940) – Eleanor's Maid (uncredited)Sandy Gets Her Man (1940) – Hattie, the Maid (uncredited)Meet the Missus (1940) – Maid (uncredited)Buy Me That Town (1941) – NancyInternational Lady (1941) – Prissy (uncredited)Henry Aldrich for President (1941) – LucindaMoon Over Her Shoulder (1941) – Juline, the Maid (uncredited)Wild Bill Hickok Rides (1942) – Daisy – Belle's MaidThe Great Man's Lady (1942) – MandyFootlight Serenade (1942) – Estelle's Maid (uncredited)Between Us Girls (1942) – Phoebe, the MaidPresenting Lily Mars (1942) – Rosa – Isobel's Maid (uncredited)Redhead from Manhattan (1943) – Polly (uncredited)Swing Shift Maisie (1943) – MyrtleeWhistling in Brooklyn (1943) – Maid (uncredited)Music for Millions (1944) – Jessie (uncredited)The Naughty Nineties (1945) – Effie – Bonita's Cook (uncredited)Saratoga Trunk (1945) – Hotel Maid (uncredited)The Sailor Takes a Wife (1945) – Mary – Freddie's Cook (uncredited)Faithful in My Fashion (1946) – Celia (uncredited)No Leave, No Love (1946) – Maid (uncredited)The Time, the Place and the Girl (1946) – Jeannie, Elaine's maid (uncredited)My Brother Talks to Horses (1947) – PsycheA Date with Judy (1948) – Nightingale (uncredited)Night Unto Night (1949) – Josephine (uncredited)Look for the Silver Lining (1949) – Violet (uncredited)

Notes

References

Further reading
 Wood, Joe. "Theatres: Charms and Some More Charms; Billie Yarbo and her Dashing Gibsonettes...". The Philadelphia Tribune. March 26, 1931. Retrieved 2 February 2021.
 "Where Are the Chorus Girls of Yester-Year?". The Baltimore Afro-American. July 6, 1935.
 Parsons, Louella. "News and Gossip of Hollywood: Magic in a Name". The Lexington Herald. May 3, 1938. Page 3.
 "Lillian Yarbo Ascends Film Ladder".The California Eagle. November 2, 1939. Page 6.
 TYP. "Lillian Yarbo Featured in Republic's 'Meet the Missus'". The New York Age. November 9, 1940. Page 4.
 Morris, Earl J. "Grand Town, Day and Night". The Pittsburgh Courier. March 22, 1941. Page 27.
 "HarlemBroadwayHollywood: The Most Consistent Source of Propaganda that shows the Negro in a derogatory light is Hollywood". New York Amsterdam News. June 6, 1942. Page 17. Retrieved February 4, 2021.
 "Actor's Relief Committee Presents a Holiday Costume Benefit Ball". Los Angeles Tribune''. November 22, 1943. Page 20.

External links
 
 
 Hungarian dance (from You Can't Take It With You) on YouTube
 From The Family Next Door (1939): Yarbo and Ruth Donnelly, followed by Yarbo's impromptu rendition of Adamson & McHugh's "That Foolish Feeling" on YouTube

1905 births
1996 deaths
20th-century American actresses
20th-century American dancers
20th-century American singers
20th-century American women singers
African-American actresses
African-American female comedians
American women comedians
20th-century African-American women singers
African-American female dancers
American film actresses
American musical theatre actresses
Actresses from Washington, D.C.
Actresses from Inglewood, California
People from Harlem
20th-century American comedians
Comedians from Washington, D.C.
Comedians from California
Comedians from New York City